.gg is the country code top-level domain for the Bailiwick of Guernsey. The domain is administered by Island Networks, who also administer the .je domain for neighbouring territory Jersey. The domain was chosen as other possible codes — .gu, .gs, and .gy — were already allocated.

Usage in video games 
Multiple video game, streamers and esports websites use this domain because "gg" is a common initialism used in multiplayer video games as an abbreviation for the phrase "good game", usually said at the end of a match. For example, the VoIP application Discord, commonly used with multiplayer games, uses the domain discord.gg as a redirect to their main website, discord.com, as well as for Discord server invite links. Other websites also use the .gg domain, such as emoji.gg, which provides emojis for Discord, start.gg, an eSports platform, and cloudbase.gg, which keeps tracks of games availability in cloud gaming services.

Second-level domains
Names have been registered principally directly at second level, but the following legacy sub-domains are still open for registration:

 .co.gg: commercial/personal domains
 .net.gg: Internet service providers and commercial
 .org.gg: organizations (free to local good causes)

See also
 .gb
 .uk
 .tv
 .me

References

External links
 Island Networks website
 IANA .gg whois information

Communications in Guernsey
Computer-related introductions in 1996
Council of European National Top Level Domain Registries members
Country code top-level domains